St Olave's Church, York (pronounced Olive) is a Grade I listed parish church of the Church of England in York.  It is situated on Marygate, by St Mary's Abbey.

History
St Olave's Church is situated within St Mary's Abbey walls, which was ruined in the Dissolution of the Monasteries. It is dedicated to St Olaf, patron saint of Norway. The Anglo-Saxon Chronicle entry for 1055 records that ‘This year died Earl Siward at York; and his body lies in the minster at Galmanho, which he had himself ordered to be built and consecrated, in the name of God and St. Olave, to the honour of God and to all his saints.’

Galmanho is a former name for the area where the church stands and Siward, Earl of Northumbria, is believed to have had his York residence. This is the earliest date for a church dedication to St Olaf (Olav in Norwegian) anywhere.

St Olave's Church was extensively rebuilt in the 15th century. Substantial repairs were carried out in the 1720s including the insertion of windows in the north aisle, the wall of which had earlier served as part of the abbey and later city defences. The church was restored in 1848 – 1849, and reopened on Wednesday 14 February 1849.

The church was again renovated starting in 1887. After a closure of 5 weeks, the church reopened on 2 September 1888. The ceiling of lath and plaster which covered the central aisle of the nave was removed. The pillars, arches and north and west walls were stripped of paint and plaster. A new chancel was added in 1887-9 by George Fowler Jones, a York architect, and later extended in 1906. This contains the five-light 15th-century east window. Despite these changes the architectural style is broadly 15th century.

Current parish life
St Olave's has a strong musical tradition, with a large choir and recently restored organ, as well as a ring of six bells hung for change ringing. In addition the orchestra of the Academy of St Olave's performs three concerts each year and plays for one orchestral Mass on Remembrance Sunday. The Sunday sung eucharist is at 10.30 using Common Worship (order one, contemporary language).

Incumbents
Initially referred to as Chaplains, the post was Curate from 1499, and Vicar from 1663.

Memorials
George Hutchinson (d. 1775)
Michael Loftus (d. 1762)
William Etty (d. 1849)

Burials

Siward, Earl of Northumbria

Organ

The pipe organ was built by J. W. Walker & Sons Ltd and dates from 1907. A specification of the organ can be found on the National Pipe Organ Register.

References

External links

 St. Olave's Church Home Page

Church of England church buildings in York
Grade I listed churches in York
15th-century church buildings in England
Anglo-Catholic church buildings in North Yorkshire
Churches dedicated to Saint Olav in the United Kingdom